Lübstorf station is a railway station in the municipality of Lübstorf, located in the Nordwestmecklenburg district in Mecklenburg-Vorpommern, Germany.

Notable places nearby
Lake Schwerin

References

Railway stations in Mecklenburg-Western Pomerania
Buildings and structures in Nordwestmecklenburg